is a town located in Chita District, Aichi Prefecture, Japan. , the town had an estimated population of 22,701 in 8852 households, and a population density of 491 persons per km². The total area of the town was

Geography
Mihama is located in the center of Chita Peninsula in southern Aichi Prefecture, bordered by Mikawa Bay to the east and Ise Bay to the west. Part of the town’s area is within the borders of the Mikawa Wan Quasi-National Park.

Neighboring municipalities
Aichi Prefecture
Taketoyo
Tokoname
Minamichita

Demographics
Per Japanese census data, the population of Mihama peaked at around the year 2005 and has been in slow decline since.

Climate
The town has a climate characterized by hot and humid summers, and relatively mild winters (Köppen climate classification Cfa).  The average annual temperature in Mihama is 15.6 °C. The average annual rainfall is 1737 mm with September as the wettest month. The temperatures are highest on average in August, at around 27.4 °C, and lowest in January, at around 4.8 °C.

History
The villages of Kōwa and Noma were established within Chita District, Aichi with the establishment of the modern municipalities system on October 1, 1889. Kōwa was raised to town status on May 6, 1903 and Noma on July 1, 1942
The town of Mihama was established on April 1, 1955 through the merger of the towns of Kōwa and Noma. On March 31, 1957, the area of the town expanded when the neighboring town of Kosugaya was dissolved, and divided between Mihama and Tokoname. During March 2006, discussions were held to merge Mihama with the town of Minamichita to the south to form the new city of “Minamicentrair” named after the popular nickname for Chūbu Centrair International Airport, but the merger proposal was strongly opposed by the majority of the inhabitants of Minamichita, and the merger did not take place.

Economy
The primary sector dominates the economy of Mihama, notably commercial fishing and agriculture.

Education
Nihon Fukushi University – Mihama Campus
Mihama has six  public elementary schools and two public junior high schools operated by the town government, and one high school operated by the Aichi Prefectural Board of Education.

Transportation

Railway
 Meitetsu – Kōwa Line
- 
 Meitetsu – Chita New Line
 -  -  -

Highway
  Minamichita Road

Local attractions

Minami-Chita Beachland - beach resort
Nomazaki Lighthouse
Sugimoto Art Museum
Tylek & Tylecek Mihama Museum

Notable people 
Otokichi, Edo period Japanese castaway

References

External links
 
 
 

 
Towns in Aichi Prefecture
Populated coastal places in Japan